Yahima Ramirez (born 10 October 1979, in Havana) is a Cuban-born Portuguese judoka, which competes in the women's –78 kg category. She won the gold medal at the 2009 Lusophony Games and a bronze at the 2008 European Judo Championships, both held in Lisbon. Ramirez won more than 10 medals and victories in the World Cups in Lisbon, 2009 and Taipei, 2015. She received one bronze medal at the European Open in Lisbon in 2018, and another at the European Cup in Malaga in 2019.

References

External links
 
 
 

1979 births
Living people
Portuguese female judoka
Portuguese people of Cuban descent
Olympic judoka of Portugal
Judoka at the 2012 Summer Olympics
European Games competitors for Portugal
Judoka at the 2015 European Games
Judoka at the 2019 European Games
Competitors at the 2018 Mediterranean Games